The Bayer designation L Puppis is shared by two stars in the constellation Puppis:
L1 Puppis (OU Puppis), a chemically peculiar α² CVn variable
L2 Puppis (HD 56096), a semiregular red giant

For technical reasons, l Puppis also links here. It is a distinct star:
l Puppis (3 Puppis), a rare A[e] supergiant

See also
j Puppis

Puppis, L
Puppis